Chris Martin (born 8 June 1986 in London) is an English stand-up comedian and writer. He currently lives and works in America with his wife, writing on The Late Late Show.

Stand-up career
Martin began his comedy career in 2005. After reaching the finals of both Chortle Student Comedian of the Year and Amused Moose Laugh off competitions Martin went on to appear in a series of Edinburgh shows, including AAA at The Pleasance Courtyard. In 2011, Martin debuted his solo show Chris Martin. No. Not That One, which sold out its entire run and received a string of 4 star reviews. He released his debut album All Over the Place in February 2022.

Live shows
 Chris Martin: The One and Only Chris Martin (2017) Edinburgh Fringe
 Chris Martin: This Show has a Soundtrack (2015) Edinburgh Fringe
 Chris Martin: Responsibilliness (2014) Edinburgh Fringe
 Chris Martin: Passionate About the Pointless (2013) Edinburgh Fringe
Milton Jones National Tour - Support Artist National venues (2013)
 Chris Martin - Spot The Difference (2012) Edinburgh Fringe
 Chris Martin - No. Not That One (2011) Edinburgh Fringe
Zoe Lyons National Tour – Support Artist National venues (2010)
Al Pitcher National Tour – Support Artist National venues (2009)
Part of AAA Stand-Up Pleasance Courtyard (2009)
Pete Firman National Tour – Support Artist National venues (2008)
Freestyle Comedy Edinburgh Festival (2008)
Three Comedians for the Price of None Edinburgh Festival (2007)
The Good, The Bad and The Cuddly Edinburgh Festival (2006)

TV and radio
 Horrible Science on CITV (2015)
 The Dog Ate My Homework on CBBC (2014; 16)
 Two Pints of Lager and a Packet of Crisps (Warm Up) on BBC3 (2011)
 Greatest Christmas Adverts on Channel 5 Objective (2010)
 Great TV Christmas Moments on Channel 5 Objective (2010)
 The Most Annoying People of 2010 on BBC 3 Shine (2010)
 "For What It's Worth" (Warm-up) Pilot Zeppotron (2010)
 "World Cup's Most Shocking Moments" BBC 3 Zig Zag (2010)
 Matt Forde's TalkSport (2010)
 Hawksbee & Jacobs on BBC Radio 5 Live (2010)
 The Most Annoying People of 2009 (2009)
 Greatest Ever 3-D Moments on Channel 4 Objective (2009)
 Chris Martin & Carl Donnelly Bitesize Podcast on iTunes (4 episodes) (2008)
 Meet the Blogs Writer/Performer Babycow (2006)

Podcasts
Martin hosted The Carl Donnelly And Chris Martin Comedy Podcast alongside comedian Carl Donnelly from 2008-2018.

In 2021, he launched his own podcast, Getting My Dad to Say I Love You.

Achievements
Guardian Top Ten Comedy Podcast 2010
Amused Moose Laugh-Off Finalist 2007
Chortle Student Comedian of the Year Runner-up 2006

References

External links

Chortle biography
Edinburgh 2011 Reviews

English male comedians
English stand-up comedians
Living people
1986 births